Cornish is a surname. Notable people with the surname include:

 Abbie Cornish (born 1982), Australian actress
 Albert J. Cornish (1856–1920), Justice of the Nebraska Supreme Court
 Audie Cornish (born 1979), American journalist
Charles John Cornish (1858-1906), English naturalist and author
 Cyril Cornish (1891–1961), Australian politician
 D. M. Cornish (born 1972), Australian fantasy author
 Francis Evans Cornish (1831–1878), Canadian politician
 Fred Cornish (1876–1940), Wales international rugby player
 Gene Cornish (born 1944), American musician (The Young Rascals)
 Harry Cornish (1871–1918), English cricketer
 Jessie J (born 1988) (real name Jessica Cornish), English R&B and Soul recording artist
 Joe Cornish (born 1968), British television personality
 Joe Cornish (photographer) (born 1958), British landscape photographer
 John Cornish (born 1837), Inaugural Anglican bishop of St Germans
 Jon Cornish (born 1984), Non-Import Canadian Football League player
 Kimberley Cornish, Australian writer on Wittgenstein and Hitler
 Mitch Cornish (born 1993), Australian rugby league player
 Richard Cornish (born 1942), Australian artist and art theoretician
 Richard Cornish (shipmaster) (died 1625), shipmaster accused of forcible sodomy
 Robert E. Cornish (1903–1963), controversial American researcher
 Samuel Cornish, 1st Baronet (c.1715 - 1750), British naval commander and MP
 Samuel Cornish (1795–1858), African-American Presbyterian minister
 Sandy Cornish (1793-1869), civic leader in Key West, Florida; former slave
 Vaughan Cornish (1862–1948), English geographer.
 Virginia Cornish, American chemist
 William Cornish (disambiguation), various people

English toponymic surnames
Ethnonymic surnames